Gunning is a small town on the Old Hume Highway, between Goulburn and Yass in the Southern Tablelands of New South Wales, Australia, about 260 km south-west of Sydney and 75 km north of the national capital, Canberra. (Nearby towns are Cullerin, Gundaroo, Dalton, Yass, Murrumbateman and Goulburn.)

The Shire of Gunning (which was amalgamated into Upper Lachlan Shire in 2004) had a population of 2,280. The Gunning Wind Farm has been established to the town's northeast, and is visible from the Hume Highway.

History 
The Gunning region was originally home to two Australian Aboriginal language groups, the Gundungurra people in the north and the Ngunnawal people in the south.

The region (specifically Gundaroo) was first explored by Europeans in 1820, and settled the next year by Hamilton Hume. In 1824, Hume and William Hovell left here to discover the overland route to Port Phillip Bay where Melbourne is sited. Land sales began in 1838. The nearby town of Dalton, now best known as the earthquake centre, was settled in 1847.

In 1865, Bushranger Ben Hall and his gang held up Kimberley's Inn, and a constable was shot dead.

In 1886 the town was described as Wheat, maize, barley, and Oats are produced in the district Natural grass is plentiful and affords good pasture for flocks and herds. The Great Southern Railway Line passes near this town. The population is 409.

Heritage listings 
Gunning has a number of heritage-listed sites, including:
 Main Southern railway: Gunning railway station

Population 
In the 2016 Census, there were 659 people in Gunning. 86.9% of people were born in Australia and 91.4% of people spoke only English at home. The most common responses for religion were Anglican 30.4%, No Religion 25.8% and Catholic 22.6%.

Transportation 
Gunning was originally a coach stop, and service centre for the surrounding farms mainly growing Merino sheep. It has a police station and court house, post office, and school.

The Main South railway from Sydney arrived in 1875 and was completed through to Albury in 1882. Gunning railway station is served by one daily NSW TrainLink XPT service in each direction operating between Sydney and Melbourne, and one weekly Xplorer service operating between Sydney and Griffith.

Its main streets were built very wide, for the time of horse and bullock-drawn wagons. This served the town well when the main highway between Sydney and Melbourne carried cars and trucks through, until the Hume Highway by-pass was completed on 5 April 1993. The town has been able to resume a more rural pace of life, and develop something of an industry in providing bed and breakfast accommodation.

The establishment of the main trunk telegraph line is remembered by the Telegraph Hotel.

Attractions

A feature of the town is Bailey's Garage, once a very busy General Motors-Holden dealership. One long exterior wall carries large images of nine notable Holden models.

Notable residents 
 Millicent Armstrong was a playwright and farmer in Gunning, New South Wales, who wrote primarily about the experiences of country life in early 20th century Australia. The plays she wrote while living in Gunning were well received and prize-winning.

Gallery

References

External links 

 Gunning info
 Gunning's Holden Wall of Fame

 
Southern Tablelands
Towns in New South Wales
1821 establishments in Australia
Upper Lachlan Shire